Lila or LILA may refer to:

Arts and entertainment 
Lila (album), debut album by American country music singer Lila McCann
 Lila (movie), a 1968 sexploitation film
 The Meaning of Lila, a comic strip written by John Forgetta and L. A. Rose
 "Lila", an abstract work of art by Fernando De Szyszlo

Literature
 Lila (Robinson novel), a novel by Marilynne Robinson
Lila: An Inquiry into Morals, a book by Robert Pirsig

Places
 Lila, Bohol, a municipality in the Philippines
 Lila, Croatia, a village near Našice, Croatia

Religion
 Lila (Hinduism), an Indic concept of the universe as a playground of the divine
 Leela attitude, an attitude of walking Buddha in Thai art

Other uses 
 Lila (given name), a female given name (including a list of people with the name)
 Lila, a name misunderstood to be a nickname of the trans-Neptunian object 136199 Eris
 Lycée International de Los Angeles, a private French school in Los Angeles
 Lila (cannon), a type of Malay cannon

See also
 Lilla (disambiguation)
 Lilas (disambiguation)
 Layla (disambiguation)
 Leila (disambiguation)
 Leela (disambiguation)
 Lelia (disambiguation)